Al-Mustansir Bi'llah (full name:Abû Ja`far al-Mustansir bi-llah al-Mansûr ben az-Zâhir Surname  Al-Mustansir), (17 February 1192 – 2 December 1242) was the Caliph of the  Abbasid dynasty from 1226 to 1242. He succeeded  Caliph Az-Zahir in the year 1226 and was the  penultimate caliph to rule from Baghdad.

Biography
Al-Mustansir was born in Baghdad on 1192. He was the son of Abu Nasr Muhammad (future caliph Al-Zahir). His mother was a Turkish Umm walad. called Zahra. His full name was Mansur ibn Muhammad al-Zahir and his Kunya was Abu Jaʿfar. At the time of his birth, his father was a prince. When his father ascended to the throne in 1225. His father, lowered the taxes of Iraq, and built a strong army to resist invasions. He died on 10 July 1226, nine months after his accession.

On his father's death in 1226 he has succeeded his father Az-Zahir as the thirty-sixth Abbasid Caliph in Baghdad. Al-Mustansir is particularly known for establishing Mustansiriya Madrasah (currently a part of the Al-Mustansiriya University) in 1227/32/34. The Madrasah, at the time, taught many subjects including medicine, mathematics, literature, grammar and Islamic religious studies, becoming a prominent and high-ranking center for Islamic studies in Baghdad. 
 The Madrasas during the Abbasid period were used as the predominant instrument to foster the spread of Islamic thought as well as a way to extend the founder's pious ideals.

The ruler of Erbil, Muzaffar ad-Din Gökböri was being without a male heir, Gökböri willed Erbil to the Abbasid caliph al-Mustansir. After the death of Gökböri in 1233, the Erbil city came under Abbasid control.

Al-Mustansir died on 5 December 1242. His son Al-Musta'sim succeeded him as the thirty-seventh and last Caliph of the Abbasid Caliphate.

Family
One of Al-Mustansir's concubines was Shahan. She was a Greek, and had been formerly a slave of Khata Khatun, the daughter of the commander Sunqur al-Nasiri the Tall and the wife of the commander Jamal al-Din Baklak al-Nasiri. After Al-Mustansir's accession to the throne, Khata presented Shahan to him as a gift, as part of a group of slaves. Shahan alone among them became his concubine and favourite. Another of his concubines was Hajir. She was the mother of the future Caliph Al-Musta'sim.

See also
 Sixth Crusade (1228–1229), a military expedition to recapture the city of Jerusalem from Muslims.

References

Sources 

 This text is adapted from William Muir's public domain, The Caliphate: Its Rise, Decline, and Fall.
 Hasan, M. (1998). History of Islam: Classical period, 571-1258 C.E. History of Islam. Islamic Publications. p. 304
 Al-Maqrizi, Al Selouk Leme'refatt Dewall al-Melouk, Dar al-kotob, 1997.
 Morray D.W. (1994) An Ayyubid Notable and His World: Ibn Al-ʻAdīm and Aleppo as Portrayed in His Biographical Dictionary of People Associated with the City, Brill. Leiden. 
 Al-Sāʿī, Ibn; Toorawa, Shawkat M.; Bray, Julia (2017). كتاب جهات الأئمة الخلفاء من الحرائر والإماء المسمى نساء الخلفاء: Women and the Court of Baghdad. Library of Arabic Literature.

1192 births
1242 deaths
13th-century Abbasid caliphs
Muslims of the Sixth Crusade
Sons of Abbasid caliphs